In Madagascar, lesbian, gay, bisexual, and transgender (LGBT) individuals face discrimination compared to non-LGBT in the country. While same-sex sexual activity is legal among individuals above the age of 21, most civic liberties such as the rights to get married and adopt children are not afforded to LGBT individuals.

Law regarding same-sex sexual activity

Same-sex sexual activity among persons at least 21 years of age is legal in Madagascar. The Penal Code provides for a prison sentence of two to five years and a fine of 2 to 10 million ariary (US$900 to US$4,500) for acts that are "indecent or against nature with an individual of the same sex under the age of 21".

Recognition of same-sex unions

Madagascar does not recognise same-sex marriage or civil unions.

Adoption and family planning

Only married, heterosexual couples may adopt children in Madagascar.

Discrimination protections

The law in Madagascar does not outlaw discrimination with regard to sexual orientation or gender identity.

Life conditions
The U.S. Department of State's 2011 Human Rights Report found that "[t]here was general societal discrimination against the LGBT community" and that "[s]exual orientation and gender identity were not widely discussed in the country, with public attitudes ranging from tacit acceptance to violent rejection, particularly of transgender sex workers". The report also found that, "LGBT sex workers were frequently targets of aggression, including verbal abuse, stone throwing, and even murder. In recent years, awareness of 'gay pride' increased through positive media exposure, but general attitudes have not changed."

In December 2019 a law was passed punishing gender-based violence. Nevertheless, the sociologist and former president of the National Council of Women of Madagascar, Noro Ravaozanany noted that "Malagasy society is not ready to move on the rights of homosexuals. Gender equality is already a challenge in 2020, even in intellectual circles".

In 2020, a 33-year-old woman was arrested for the statutory rape of a 19-year-old woman, after her mother filed a complaint. A law punishes "anyone who has committed an indecent or unnatural act with an individual of her sex, under the age of 21" with imprisonment. The mother wanted to take revenge for her daughter's decision to file a complaint against her father, who had raped her. A campaign to support the couple was organised on social networks, while Noro Ravaozanany declared that it was "scandalous that the mother did not defend her daughter against this incest. ... It was revenge on the part of the mother and a way to cover up the accusation of incest and rape". On social media, the couple's supporters were victims of insults and death threats; religious leaders, accused them of "promoting homosexuality" and also offered the young woman conversion therapy. Although homosexuality is not illegal in Madagascar, it remains as a sensitive issue which is strongly condemned by Malagasy society.

In early July 2021, the Malagasy government canceled an LGBT party held in a bar in Antananarivo, on the grounds of "incitement to debauchery".

Summary table

See also

Human rights in Madagascar
LGBT rights in Africa

References

External links
UK government travel advice for Madagascar: Local laws and customs

Madagascar
LGBT in Madagascar
Law of Madagascar
Human rights in Madagascar
Politics of Madagascar